The Anglican Diocese of Sierra Leone was founded in 1852.

Bishops of Sierra Leone

 1852–1854 Owen Vidal (1st bishop, died at sea, 1854) 
 1855–1857 John Weeks (died in office of "African Sickness")
 1857–1860 John Bowen (died in office of Yellow Fever)
 1860–1869 Edward Beckles
 1870-1882 Henry Cheetham
 1883–1897 Graham Ingham
 1897–1901 John Taylor Smith
 1902–1909 Edmund Elwin
 1910–1921 John Walmsley
 1923–1936 George Wright (afterwards Bishop of North Africa, 1936)
 1936–1961 James L.C. Horstead (also Archbishop of West Africa, 1955–1961)
 11 June 1948after 1957: Percy Jones, assistant bishop
 1961–1981 Moses N.C.O. Scott (also Archbishop of West Africa, 1969–1981)

Curates of Freetown
 1855-1858 Revd Francis Pocock was Chaplain to John Weeks. He returned to England where he founded Monkton Combe School in 1868.  Amongst the school's earliest pupils were young men from Freetown.

References

Anglican dioceses established in the 19th century